Lee Chang-sun (born February 7, 1988), better known by his stage name Lee Joon, is a South Korean actor, singer, model and DJ. He is best known as a former member of the South Korean boy band MBLAQ. He had notable roles in Gapdong (2014), My Father Is Strange (2017), The Silent Sea (2021) and Bulgasal (2021).

Career

Beginnings
Before becoming a part of MBLAQ, Lee acted in CFs, had a small non-recurring role in the first episode of the sitcom That Person Is Coming (그분이 오신다), which aired in 2008, and began and completed filming for the 2009 film, Ninja Assassin in which he portrayed the Teenage Raizo.

Music career

After training under Rain and J. Tune Entertainment, Lee became a member of South Korean quintet boyband MBLAQ, serving as a vocalist and main dancer. The group debuted on October 9, 2009 at Rain's Legend of Rainism concert where they performed various songs from their then-unreleased single album Just BLAQ. MBLAQ's first single, "Oh Yeah", was released to the public through a music video on October 14, 2009 with their debut single album, Just BLAQ releasing on the same day. MBLAQ made their broadcast debut with the song "Oh Yeah" on Mnet's M! Countdown.

MBLAQ made their Japanese debut on May 3, 2011, with an event held at the Kanagawa Lazona Kawasaki Plaza which gathered a reported 10,000 fans. A day later, on May 4, they released their first Japanese single "Your Luv" which immediately reached first position of the Oricon Daily Charts, selling more than 11,000 copies.

With MBLAQ, he released three single albums, seven EPs and one studio album. He left the group in October 2014.

On October 18, 2017 ahead of his mandatory military enlistment Lee released his first solo digital single, "What I Want to Give to You", a pop ballad song written by his former MBLAQ band-mate Thunder.

Acting career
In 2010, he was cast in Jungle Fish 2, a youth drama which tackles real life issues about students. He participated in the OST for Jungle Fish 2, singing the song "슬픈예감 (Feeling Sad)" with Hong Jong-hyun.

In 2011, Lee lent his voice for the Korean dub of the film Gnomeo & Juliet.

In 2012 he was cast in Iris II, the sequel to the espionage series Iris. 
The same year, he joined the variety show, We Got Married where he was paired up with Oh Yeon-seo in an on-screen marriage.

In 2013, Lee starred in the film Rough Play, produced by Kim Kiduk. The film was unusually risque for a pop idol due to the numerous nude sex scenes he had to perform in it.
He won the Best Male Newcomer award at the 1st Wildflower Film Awards for his performance, and was also nominated for the Best New Actor award at the 50th Baeksang Arts Awards and the 23rd Buil Film Awards.

In 2014, Lee had roles in the crime thriller Gap-dong and romance comedy fantasy drama Mr. Back.

In 2015, Lee starred in SBS' black comedy drama Heard It Through the Grapevine, winning accolades at the 8th Korea Drama Awards and 4th APAN Star Awards for his performance. In the same year, he was signed to Prain TPC.

The same year, he featured in the period mystery film The Piper; and lent his voice to the animated zombie film, Seoul Station.

In 2016, Lee starred in OCN's fantasy thriller The Vampire Detective as the title role. The same year, he had a supporting role in MBC's legal drama Woman with a Suitcase. He also co-starred in the action comedy film, Luck Key.

In 2017, Lee Joon starred in KBS2's weekend family drama, My Father is Strange.

In 2021, Lee starred in Netflix Original series The Silent Sea. In the same year, Lee starred in tvN/Netflix fantasy series Bulgasal: Immortal Souls.

In 2022, Lee stars in KBS2' s upcoming historical drama Bloody Heart which is set to be released on May 2, 2022. In the Bloody Heart, Lee plays the role of Lee Tae who becomes King of Joseon. In same year, it was announced that Lee Joon will hold the '2022 Lee Jun Busan Fan Camp' at Busan Metropolitan City's Arpina, Haeundae-gu, Busan.

Radio career
In 2019, after being discharged from the military, Lee Joon started hosting the radio show Lee Joon's Youngstreet as Joon Haeng Ja on SBS Power FM.

Personal life

Lee Joon was born and raised in Seoul, South Korea, and has an older sister. He won second place in a dance competition and thus won a scholarship to Seoul Arts High School. He majored in modern dance at the Korea National University of Arts and attended Kyung Hee Cyber University. Lee has stated that he was diagnosed with bipolar disorder.

Lee began his mandatory military service as an active duty soldier on October 24, 2017, attending a five-week basic training in Pocheon, Gyeonggi Province. Lee completed his training first among 183 comrades. He was assigned to 8th Battalion to complete his duty.

Due to suffering with panic disorder while carrying out his military duties, Lee was deemed inadequate to serve as an active duty soldier, and was transferred to reservist duty. Lee completed his remaining mandatory duty as a public service officer. He was discharged on December 19, 2019.

Discography

As lead artist

As featured artist

Soundtrack appearances

Filmography

Film

Television series

Web series

Awards and nominations

References

External links

 Lee Joon Japan Official Fanclub
 
 

1988 births
J. Tune Entertainment artists
Living people
K-pop singers
South Korean male idols
South Korean dance musicians
South Korean rhythm and blues singers
South Korean pop singers
South Korean male singers
South Korean male film actors
South Korean male television actors
Kyung Hee Cyber University alumni
People from Seoul
Male actors from Seoul
Singers from Seoul
People with bipolar disorder
Seoul Arts High School alumni
MBLAQ members